The Cabrini class is a new high-speed multipurpose patrol boat class of the Italian Navy (Marina Militare), also known as Unità Navale Polifunzionale ad Alta Velocità (UNPAV) or K-180.

The Italian shipbuilding company Intermarine has begun building two high-speed multipurpose vessels for the Italian Navy, as part of a wider fleet rebuilding programme being delivered under the Legge Navale (or 'naval law'). The two naval units are destined for the special forces of the COMSUBIN.

Design 
The vessels will embark special forces units from the navy and other Italian services, as well as deploying naval diving units. The vessels carry a crew of nine and can embark up to 20 additional personnel. The vessels are expected to have an endurance of 10 days with nine on board. The hull and superstructure are designed to reduce radar, infrared (IR), and acoustic signatures. It is possible to install a containerized decompression chamber to support underwater activities. Ballistic protection is also provided for operating areas on the platform. The platforms are expected to receive a scaled-down fit of the same integrated navigation and command, control, and communications (C3) suite selected for larger vessels being delivered under the Legge Navale, Leonardo SADOC Mk4.

Ships

References

External links
 Ships Marina Militare website

Ships built in La Spezia
2017 ships
Patrol vessels of the Italian Navy
Proposed ships